Senica Airport  is a private airport near the city of Senica in western Slovakia. The airport is operated by Záhorácky Aeroklub Senica.

Airlines and Destinations
As of February 2022, there are no scheduled passenger services to/from Senica Airport.

References

 Official site of Záhorácky Aeroklub Senica
 
 

Airports in Slovakia